The French Air and Space Force (AAE) is the air and space force of the French Armed Forces. On 10 September 2020, it assumed its current name, the French Air and Space Force, to reflect an "evolution of its mission" into the area of outer space.

The number of aircraft in service with the French Air and Space Force varies depending on the source; the Ministry of Armed Forces gives a figure of 658 aircraft in 2014. According to 2018 data, this figure includes 210 combat aircraft: 115 Dassault Mirage 2000 and 95 Dassault Rafale.  the French Air and Space Force employs a total of 40,500 regular personnel, with a reserve element of 5,187 in 2014.

The Chief of Staff of the French Air and Space Force (CEMAAE) is a direct subordinate of the Chief of the Defence Staff (CEMA), a high-ranking military officer who in turn answers to the civilian Minister of the Armed Forces.

History

In the beginning

Establishment of the  

The founding of the  began in 1909, when the French War Minister approved the purchase of a Wright Biplane. The following year, another Wright biplane, a Bleriot, and two Farmans were added to the lone acquisition. On 22 October 1910, General Pierre Roques was appointed Inspector General of what was becoming referred to as the Cinquieme Arme, or Fifth Service.

In March 1912, the French parliament enacted legislation to establish the air arm. It was projected to consist of three distinct branches based on aircraft missions—reconnaissance, bombing, or countering other aircraft.

Inventing the fighter plane 

France was one of the first states to start building aircraft. At the beginning of World War I, France had a total of 148 planes (eight from French Naval Aviation) and 15 airships.
In August 1914, as France entered World War I, French airpower consisted of 24 squadrons supporting ground forces, including three squadrons assigned to cavalry units. By 8 October, expansion to 65 squadrons was being planned. By December, the plans called for 70 new squadrons.

Meanwhile, even as procurement efforts scaled up, inventive airmen were trying to use various light weapons against opposing airplanes. Roland Garros invented a crude method of firing a machine gun through the propeller arc by cladding his propeller with metal wedges deflecting any errant bullets. After destroying three German airplane, Garros came down behind enemy lines on 18 April 1915. His secret weapon was thus exposed, and Anthony Fokker came up with the synchronization gear that by July 1, 1915, that turned airplanes into flying gun platforms.

Founding fighter formations 

On 21 February 1916, the Verdun Offensive began. New weapons demand new tactics. Commandant Charles de Tricornet de Rose was the original French pilot, having learned to fly in March 1911. This experienced flier was given a free hand to select pilots and airplanes for a new unit tasked with keeping German observation craft from over the French lines. The ad hoc unit commandeered all available Morane-Saulniers and Nieuport 11s, as well as the 15 best pilots regardless of posting. This ad hoc unit patrolling the skies over Verdun was the first French . The  was successful despite Tricornet's death in a mishap. Under the leadership of new commander Captain Auguste de Reverand, such flying aces as Georges Guynemer, Charles Nungesser, and Albert Deullin began their careers.

Encouraged by the success of their original , the French massed several squadrons for the Battle of the Somme. The burgeoning French aircraft inventory afforded the formation of  under Captain Felix Brocard. The  was formed on 1 July 1916 with a posting of four Nieuport squadrons: Squadron N.3, N.26, N.73, and N.103. Three other squadrons--Squadron N.37, N.62, and N.65 were temporarily attached at various times.

On 19 October 1916, three fixed  were established, each to consist of four squadron. Numbered 11, 12, and 13, they were only the first three .

Concentrating airpower 

Again, each new  was assigned four Nieuport fighter squadrons; again, each was sent to support a different French field army.

On 10 January 1918,  was formed from four SPAD squadrons. In February, five more  were founded from SPAD squadrons:  number 17, 18, 19, 20, and 21. The various Nieuport models were now being phased out as the new SPADs filled the inventories of the French.

With the  success, the French were encouraged to amass airpower into still larger tactical units. Each  would be stocked with 72 fighters.

The  were not the end of the French accumulation of air power. The bombing units were both equipped with 45 Breguet 14 bombers. The last addition to the new division was five protection squadrons, operating 75 Caudron R.11 gunships to fly escort for the Breguets.

On 25 June 1918,  was founded.  followed soon thereafter. A couple of night bombardment  were also founded.

Committing the Division Aerienne 

Then, on 15 July 1918, the Division was committed to the Second Battle of the Marne. From then on, whether in whole or in part, the  fought until war's end. By the time of the Battle of Saint-Mihiel, the French could commit 27 fighter squadrons to the effort, along with reconnaissance and bombing squadrons. The 1,137 airplanes dedicated to the battle were the most numerous used in a World War I battle.

When the 11 November 1918 armistice came, French air power had expanded to 336 squadrons, 74 of which were SPAD fighter squadrons. France had 3,608 planes in service. Confirmed claims of 2,049 destroyed enemy airplanes included 307 that had been brought down within French lines. French airmen had also destroyed 357 observation balloons. However, 5,500 pilots and observers were killed out of the 17,300 engaged in the conflict, amounting to 31%. A 1919 newspaper article reported that the French Air Force had suffered losses of 61%.

Interwar period 

Military aeronautics was established as a "special arm" by the law of 8 December 1922. It remained under the auspices of the French Army. It was not until 2 July 1934, that the "special arm" became an independent service and was totally independent.

The initial air arm was the cradle of French military parachuting, responsible for the first formation of the Air Infantry Groups in the 1930s, out of which the Air Parachute Commandos descended.

The French Air Force maintained a continuous presence across the French colonial empire, particularly from the 1920s to 1943.

World War II 
The French Air Force played an important role in WWII, most notably during the Battle of France in 1940. The Vichy French Air Force had later a significant presence in the French Levant.

The engagement of the Free French Air Forces from 1940 to 1943, and then the engagement of the aviators of the French Liberation Army, were also important episodes in the history of the French Air Force. The sacrifices of Commandant René Mouchotte and Lieutenant Marcel Beau illustrated their devotion.

1945–present 

After 1945, France rebuilt its aircraft industry. The French Air Force participated in several colonial wars during the Empire such as French Indochina after the Second World War. Since 1945, the French Air Force was notably engaged in Indochina (1945–1954).

The French Air Force was active in Algeria from 1952 until 1962 and Suez (1956), later Mauritania and Chad, the Persian Gulf (1990–1991), ex-Yugoslavia and more recently in Afghanistan, Mali and Iraq.

From 1964 until 1971 the French Air Force had the unique responsibility for the French nuclear arm via Dassault Mirage IV or ballistic missiles of Air Base 200 Apt-Saint-Christol on the Plateau d'Albion.

In 1964, the Second Tactical Air Command was created in Nancy to take command of air units stationed in France but not assigned to NATO. The Dassault Mirage IV, the principal French strategic bomber, was designed to strike Soviet positions as part of the French nuclear triad.

In 1985, the Air Force had four major flying commands, the Strategic Air Forces Command, the Tactical Air Forces Command, the Military Air Transport Command, and CAFDA (air defence).

CFAS had two squadrons of S2 and S-3 IRBMs at the Plateau d'Albion, six squadrons of Mirage IVAs (at Mont de Marsan, Cazaux, Orange, Istres, St Dizier, and EB 3/94 at Luxeuil - Saint-Sauveur Air Base), and three squadrons of C-135F, as well as a training/reconnaissance unit, CIFAS 328, at Bordeaux. The tactical air command included wings EC 3, EC 4, EC 7, EC 11, EC 13, and ER 33, with a total of 19 squadrons of Mirage III, Jaguars, two squadrons flying the Mirage 5F (EC 2/13 and EC 3/13, both at Colmar), and a squadron flying the Mirage F.1CR. CoTAM counted 28 squadrons, of which ten were fixed-wing transport squadrons, and the remainder helicopter and liaison squadrons, at least five of which were overseas. CAFDA numbered 14 squadrons mostly flying the Mirage F.1C. Two other commands had flying units, the Air Force Training Command, and the Air Force Transmissions Command, with four squadrons and three trials units.

Dassault Aviation led the way mainly with delta-wing designs, which formed the basis for the Dassault Mirage III series of fighter jets. The Mirage demonstrated its abilities in the Six-Day War, Yom Kippur War, Falklands War, and Gulf War, becoming one of the most popular jet fighters of its day and being widely sold.

In 1994, the Fusiliers Commandos de l'Air command was reestablished under a different form.

The French Air Force entered a phase of inventory replacement and expansion. The Air Force ordered the Airbus A400M military transport aircraft, then in development. By November 2016, 11 had already been delivered to ET00.061 at Orleans-Bricy, and integration of the new Dassault Rafale multi-role jet fighter was underway; the first 20-aircraft squadron became operational in 2006 at Saint-Dizier.

In 2009, France rejoined the NATO Military Command Structure, having been absent since 1966. France was a leading nation, alongside the United States, Great Britain and Italy in implementing the UN sponsored no-fly zone in Libya (NATO Operation Unified Protector), deploying 20 fighter aircraft to Benghazi in defense of rebel-held positions and the civilian population.

The last remaining squadron of Dassault Mirage F1s retired the aircraft in July 2014 and replaced them with Dassault Rafales.

On 13 July 2019, President Emmanuel Macron announced the creation of a space command, which would come into being within the French Air Force by September 2019, and the transformation of the French Air Force into the French Air and Space Force. According to Defense Minister Florence Parly, France reserves the right to arm French satellites with lasers for defensive purposes.

The official renaming occurred on 24 July 2020, with the new Air and Space Force logo unveiled on 11 September 2020.

Structure

The Chief of Staff of the French Air and Space Force (CEMAAE) determines French Air and Space Force doctrines application and advises the Chief of the Defence Staff (CEMA) on the deployment, manner, and use of the Air and Space Force. They are responsible for the preparation and logistic support of the French Air and Space Force. Finally, the CEMAA is assisted by the Inspectorate of the French Air and Space Force (IAA) and by the French Air and Space Force Health Service Inspection (ISSAA).

The Air and Space Force is organized in accordance with Chapter 4, Title II, Book II of the Third Part of the French Defense Code, which replaced decree n° 91-672 dated 14 July 1991.

Under the authority of the Chief of Staff of the French Air and Space Force (CEMAAE) in Paris, the Air and Space Force includes:
 Forces
 Air Bases
 Directorate of Human Resources of the French Air and Space Force
 Services

The Air and Space Force headquarters, employing 150 personnel, are located alongside the Chief of the Defence Staff's offices (EMA) and the Army and Navy headquarters at the Balard armed forces complex in Paris. The new site replaced the former Paris Air Base (BA 117) which served as air staff headquarters until 25 June 2015.

Commands 
The French Air and Space Force has had three commands: two grand operational commands (CDAOA and CFAS) and one organic command (CFA).
 Commandement de la Défense Aérienne et des Opérations Aériennes (English: Air Defense and Air Operations Command (CDAOA)), is responsible for surveillance of French airspace, as well as all aerial operations in progress. It does not possess aircraft. Instead it exercises operational control over units of the Air Forces Command (CFA).
 Air Defence and Air Operations Staff composed of the:
 Air Force Operational Staff and the
 Permanent readiness command center, both situated at the Balard complex (the French Air and Space Force main HQ)
 direct reporting units:
 Air Force Operations Brigade (all units at BA 942 Lyon-Mont Verdun air base)
 National Air Operations Center
 Core Joint Force Air Component HQ (Core JFAC HQ)
 Analysis and Simulation Center for Air Operations Preparation
 Air Force Operational Awareness and Planning Brigade
 Air Force Intelligence Center at BA 942 Lyon-Mont Verdun air base
 National Target Designation Center at BA 110 Creil-Senlis air base
 Land-based Electronic Warfare Squadron at BA 123 Orléans-Bricy air base
 Intelligence Training Squadron 20.530 (Metz), training air and space force and naval officers, integrated in the Joint Intelligence Training Center (CFIAR) in Strasbourg
 Air Force Brigade for Permanent Aerial Security Readiness (Brigade aérienne de la posture permanente de la sûreté aérienne (BAPPS)), based  at BA 942 Lyon-Mont Verdun air base, created at the end of 2020 and in charge of air policing
 detection and control centers:
 Detection and Control Center 07.927 Tours – Cinq-Mars-la-Pile (Codename: Raki, AOR: Northwestern France)
 Detection and Control Center 04.930 Mont-de-Marsan (Codename: Marina, AOR: Southwestern France)
 Detection and Control Center 05.942 Lyon – Mont Verdun (Codename: Rambert, AOR: Southeastern France)
 Strategic Air Forces Command (CFAS)), is responsible for the air force's nuclear strike units (Dassault Rafale B armed with ASMP-A missiles), as well as the tanker / strategic transport aircraft (C-135FR, Boeing KC-135 Stratotanker).
 Command HQ (Commandement des CFAS), based at Vélizy-Villacoublay Air Base (BA 107)
 4th Fighter Wing (4e Escadre de chasse (4e EC)), based at Saint-Dizier – Robinson Air Base (BA 113)
 Wing Command (Commandement d'escadre 00.113)
 Fighter Squadron 01.004 "Gascogne" (Escadron de chasse 01.004 Gascogne), tactical nuclear strike fighter squadron, flying Rafale B variant
 Fighter Squadron 02.004 "La Fayette" (Escadron de Chasse 02.004 La Fayette), tactical nuclear strike fighter squadron, flying Rafale variant
 Rafale Conversion Squadron 03.004 "Aquitaine" (Escadron de transformation Rafale 03.004 Aquitaine), joint air force - navy OCU flying Rafale B/C/M variants
 Aeronautical Technical Support Squadron 15.004 "Haute-Marne" (Escadron de soutien technique aéronautique 15.004 Haute-Marne)
 31st Aerial Refuel and Strategic Transport Wing (31e Escadre aérienne de ravitaillement et de transport stratégiques (31e EARTS)), based at Istres-Le Tubé Air Base (BA 125).
 Wing Command (Commandement d'escadre 00.113)
 Aerial Refuel and Strategic Transport Squadron 01.031 "Bretagne" (Escadron de ravitaillement en vol et de transport stratégique 01.031 Bretagne), flying the Airbus A330 MRTT
 Operational Conversion Squadron 03.031 "Phénix" (Escadron de transformation Phénix 03.031 Landes), A330MRTT OCU
 Aerial Refuel Squadron 04.031 "Sologne" (Escadron de ravitaillement en vol 4/31 Sologne), winding down operations of the C-135FR
 Transport Squadron 03.060 "Esterel" (Escadron de transport 3/60 Esterel), presidential air transport with the Airbus A330
 Aeronautical Technical Support Squadron 15.031 "Camargue" (Escadron de soutien technique aéronautique 15.031 Camargue)
 Specialised Technical Support Squadron 15.093 (Escadron de soutien technique spécialisé 15.093)
 Air Forces Command (CFA)), Bordeaux-Mérignac Air Base, as an organic command, prepares units to fulfill operational missions. From September 2013, the former organic commands CFA and CSFA were merged into CFA. CFA is organized in six brigades:
 Fighter Brigade – ( (BAAC)), is responsible for all air defense, air-to-ground and reconnaissance aircraft (including Dassault Rafale, Mirage 2000-5F, Mirage 2000B/C/D, Transall C-160 Gabriel). In February 2016 it was commanded by Brigadier General (Air) Philippe Lavigne.
 Projection and Support Air Force Brigade ( (BAAP)), is responsible for all tactical transport and liaison aircraft (aircraft and helicopters: Transall, C-160, Hercules C-130, A310/319, Dassault Falcon 50/900, Aérospatiale SA 330 Puma, Eurocopter Fennec, Eurocopter AS332 Super Puma, SOCATA TBM);
 Airspace Control Brigade ( (BACE)), is responsible for (Airborne early warning and control aircraft, and ground radar, ground-based air defense systems and missile defence, communication networks) airspace surveillance, constituting the Système de Commandement et de Conduite des Opérations Aérospatiales). Since 2007 the command, control and information systems network of the air and space force have been is integrated into the Joint Directorate of Infrastructure Networks and Information Systems (DIRISI))
 airborne airspace surveillance units:
 36th Airborne Command and Control Wing (36e escadre de commandement et de conduite aéroportés (36e EC2A)), based at Avord Air Base (BA 702)
 36th Airborne Command and Control Squadron "Berry" (36e escadron de détection et de contrôle aéroportés Berry), flying the Boeing E-3F Sentry
 ground-based airspace surveillance units:
 GRAVES System
 3 surveillance and air defence radar installations equipped with the Ground Master 406 radar: années 2010 trois Ground Master 406, le premier installé en Guyane, le second sur la base aérienne de Nice en 2017 et le troisième sur la Base aérienne 942 and at Lyon-Mont Verdun Air Base (BA 942) in 2019.
 12 surveillance and air defence radar installations equipped with the Ground Master 403T radar in metropolitan France, re-equipped in the 2019 - 2022 period.
 airspace controle of military air bases:
 units for local aerospace surveillance of the immediate environs of air bases (CLA) ;
 approach radars and landing aide systems
 surface-to-air missile units (each ADSA squadron is composed of two batteries of SAMP/T and one battery of Crotale NG SAMs):
 Air Defence Surface-to-Air Wing - 1st Air Defence Artillery Regiment (Escadre sol-air de défense aérienne - 1er régiment d'artillerie de l'air), based at Avord Air Base (BA 702)
 Air Defence Surface-to-Air Squadron 02.950 "Sancerre" (Escadron de défense sol-air 02.950 "Sancerre")
 Technical Support Surface-to-Air Squadron (Escadron de soutien technique sol-air 2E.950)
 Air Defence Surface-to-Air Training Center (Centre de formation de la défense sol-air 14.950)
 Air Defence Surface-to-Air Squadron 01.950 "Crau" (Escadron de défense sol-air 01.950 "Crau") (Base aérienne 125 Istres-Le Tubé)
 Air Defence Surface-to-Air Squadron 05.950 "Barrois" (Escadron de défense sol-air 05.950 "Barrois") (Base aérienne 113 Saint-Dizier-Robinson)
 Air Defence Surface-to-Air Squadron 12.950 "Tursan" (Escadron de défense sol-air 12.950 "Tursan") (Base aérienne 118 Mont-de-Marsan)
 surface-to-air signals units in metropolitan France (METEOR system, in process of replacement by the SRSA system)
 Air Force Special Forces Brigade (Brigade des forces spéciales air (BFSA)). In the 2020 - 2021 period the French Air and Space Force overhauled the force structure of its security and firefighting and rescue units, which were previously grouped together in the Air Force Security and Intervention Forces Brigade ( (BAFSI)).
 aerial units:
 Escadron de Transport 3/61 Poitou - aircraft special operations support squadron based at Orléans –Bricy Air Base and flying C-130H, C-160 and DHC-6 Twin Otter, to convert to Airbus A400M Atlas
 Escadron d'Hélicoptères 1/67 Pyrénées - helicopter special operations support squadron based at Cazaux Air Base and flying EC725 Caracal
 air force commando units:
 Air Force Parachutist Commando 10 (CPA n°10) - the Air Force's primary special operations unit, based at Orléans – Bricy Air Base
 Air Force Parachutist Commando 30 (CPA n°30) - previously the Air Force's primary combat search and rescue unit, refocused to special operations, based at Orléans – Bricy Air Base
 force protection units:
 Air Force Parachutist Commando 20 (CPA n°20) - the Air Force's primary security unit. Composed of two operational companies and a reserve platoon for a total of up to 400 personnel: Compagnie Bretagne (protection force), Compagnie Normandie (protection force) and Section de réservistes (protection force reservists and instructors). 
 Escadrons de protection (EP).
 specialised training units:
 Air Force Parachute Training Center 51.566 (C.A.S.V. 51.566 Le Centre Air de Saut en Vol), based at Orléans – Bricy Air Base
 Operational Training Center for Air Force [Land] Combatants (Centre de Préparation Opérationnel des Combattants de l'Armée de l'air (CPOCAA)) - training unit for the CPA 10 and 30, based at Orange-Caritat Air Base
 Detachment (détachement du CPOCAA), based at Orléans – Bricy Air Base
 le Centre de formation à la survie et au sauvetage (CFSS) ;Centre de formation à la survie et au sauvetage 61.566 (CFSS). base aérienne 120 de Cazaux.
 Detachment for officer training for land combat (détachement CFA) at the École de l'air et de l'espace
 Air Force Firefighters Brigade (Brigade des pompiers de l’air (BPA)), formed in 2021. It brings together the rescue and firefighting personnel (called incident technicians and grouped into squadrons of company size) of the Air Force into 25 units of around 1 500 personnel. HQ is in Cazaux Air Base (BA 120);
 Air Force Aerial Weapon Systems Brigade ( (BASAA)) provides the maintenance and repair of aerial weapons and target systems.
 Air Force Maneuver Support Brigade ( (BAAMA)) provides the ground-based engineer and logistics personnel (including expeditionary) needed for the sustainment of air operations., based at Bordeaux–Mérignac Air Base (BA 106):
 Expeditionary Command and Control Air Force Wing 00.550 (Escadre aérienne de commandement et de conduite projetable 00.550 (EAC2P 00.550)), based at Évreux-Fauville Air Base (BA 105) and formed on August 27, 2015 on the basis of the former  Groupement tactique des systèmes d’information et de communication (GTSICAéro).
 Wing Command (Commandement d'escadre 00.550)
 Tactical Telecommunications Systems Squadron 11.550 (Escadron des systèmes de télécommunication tactiques 11.550)
 Tactical Surveillance Systems Squadron 12.550 (Escadron des systèmes de surveillance tactiques 12.550)
 Tactical Information Systems Squadron 13.550 (Escadron des systèmes d’information tactiques 13.550)
 Tactical Training and Expertise Squadron 14.550 (Escadron d'expertise et d'instruction tactiques 14.550)
Operational Support Air Force Wing 00.513 (Escadre aérienne d'appui aux opérations 00.513 (EAAO 00.513)), based at Bordeaux-Mérignac Air Base (BA 106) and formed on November 24, 2021 on the basis of the former Groupement aérien d’appui aux opérations (GAAO).
Wing Command (Commandement d'escadre 00.513)
Operational Infrastructure Squadron 11.513 (Escadron d'infrastructure en opérations 11.513)
Operational Infrastructure Squadron 13.513 (Escadron d'infrastructure en opérations 13.513)
Operational Infrastructure Squadron 15.513 (Escadron d'infrastructure en opérations 15.513)
Expeditionary Training Squadron 17.513 (Escadron d'instruction au déploiement 17.513)
25th Air Force Engineer Regiment (25ème Régiment du Génie de l’Air), army regiment permanently attached to the air force. Based at Istres-Le Tubé Air Base (BA 125). 
2nd Operational Air Force Engineer Company (2e Compagnie opérationnelle du génie de l’air (2e COGA)), based at Mont-de-Marsan Air Base (BA 118).
4th Operational Air Force Engineer Company (4e Compagnie opérationnelle du génie de l’air (4e COGA)), based at Avord Air Base (BA 702).
Aeronautical Installations Air Force Groupment (Groupement aérien des installations aéronautiques (GAIA)), based at Bordeaux-Mérignac Air Base (BA 106) 
 French Space Command ( (CDE)), HQ at Toulouse Space Centre
 Operational Preparation and Employment Division (Division préparation opérationnelle et emploi (DPOE)), Hexagone Balard, Paris
 Space Operations Air Force Brigade (Brigade aérienne des opérations spatiales (BAOS)), based at Toulouse Space Center. By 2025 the CMOS and the COSMOS will relocate to Toulouse Space Center as well. In preparation for this the French Air and Space Force has formed the military installation FA 101 (Formation administrative (FA 101)) on the premises of the space center.
 Space Operations Command and Control Center (Centre de Commandement et de Contrôle des opérations spatiales (C3OS)), based at Toulouse Space Center
 Satellite Observation Military Center 01.092 "Bourgogne", based at Creil-Senlis Air Base (BA 110)
 Operational Center for Military Surveillance of Space Objects, based at Lyon – Mont Verdun Air Base (BA 942)

These last two brigades belonged until 2013 to the Air Force Support Command (CSFA), which maintained the arms systems, equipment, information and communication systems (SIC) as well as infrastructure. The CSFA supported the human element, the military logistics (supply and transport), wherever, previously, forces of the French Air and Space Force operated or trained. These two brigades are now subordinate to the CFA.

The official designation of the service was changed in July 2019 from Air Army to Air and Space Army, when the previous joint Inter-Service Space Command ( (CIE)) under the French General Staff was transformed into the Space Command ( (CDE)) and absorbed into the Air and Space Force as its fourth command.

All air regions were disestablished on 1 January 2008. In the 1960s, there were five air regions (RA). The number was then reduced to four by a decree of 30 June 1962 with the disestablishment of the 5th Aerial Region (French North Africa). The decree of 14 July 1991 reduced the air regions to three: « RA Atlantic », « RA Mediterranean » and «  RA North-East ». On 1 July 2000 was placed into effect an organization consisting of « RA North » (RAN) and « RA South » (RAS). The territorial division was abolished by decree n°2007-601 of 26 April 2007.

From 2008 to 2010 the French Air Force underwent the "Air 2010" streamlining process. The main targets of this project were to simplify the command structure, to regroup all military and civil air force functions and to rationalise and optimise all air force units. Five major commands, were formed, instead of the former 13, and several commands and units were disbanded.

Support services 
The Directorate of Human Resources of the Air and Space Force (DRH-AAE) recruits, trains, manages, administers, and converts personnel of the Air and Space Force. Since January 2008, the DRH-AAE groups the former Air Force directorate of military personnel (DPMMA) and some tasks of the former Air Force Training Command. The directorate is responsible for Air and Space Force recruitment via the recruiting bureau.

French joint defence service organisations, supporting the air and space force, include:
 The Integrated Structure of Maintaining Operational Conditioning of Aeronautical Defense Materials (SIMMAD).
 The Aeronautical Industrial Service (SIAE).
 The " Air Commissariat " between 1947 and 2007, then " Financial and General Administration Service " from 2008 until 2009, and finally the " Commissariat Service of the Armed Forces " (SCA) since 2010, have successively been designated as administrative services of the French Air and Space Force. The Commissioners as well as Civilians of this service carry out : operations support, individual legal rights, judicial, internal control accountability, financial and purchase executions, and support and protection of the combatant.

Wings 
In 1932, the "regiment" designation was replaced with "Escadre", which until 1994 was a unit consisting of the following:
 units (escadrons or groups) generally equipped with the same type of aircraft or at least assuring the same type of mission
 units of maintenance and support.

 (wings) were dissolved from 1993 as part of the  reorganisation, were reestablished in 2014. The problems caused by having the aircraft maintenance units not responsible to the flying squadrons they supported eventually forced the change.

Four  were reformed in the first phase:
  at Istres-Le Tubé Air Base on 27 August 2014
  at Avord Air Base on 5 September 2014
  (ESADA – 1er RAA) at Avord Air Base (3 September 2014)

In the second phase, the French Air Force announced in August 2015 the creation of six additional wings:

The French Air and Space Force announced in August 2015 that unit numbering, moves of affected aircraft, and the transfer of historic material (flags, traditions and names) would be completed in 2016.
Another air force wing was added on September 5, 2019:

Squadrons and flights 
Commanded by a lieutenant-colonel, the Escadron is the basic operational unit. This term replaced that of Group as of 1949 with the aim to standardize usage with the allies of NATO who were using the term 'squadron'. However, the term Group did not entirely disappear: the term was retained for the Aerial Group 56 Mix Vaucluse, specialized in Special Operations or Group – Groupe de Ravitaillement en Vol 02.091 Bretagne which is still carrying the same designation since 2004.

A fighter squadron can number some twenty machines, spread in general in three Escadrilles. A Transport Escadron can theoretically count a dozen Transall C-160, however, numbers are usually much less for heavier aircraft (three Airbus A310-300 and two Airbus A340-200 for the Transport Escadron 3/60 Estérel).

The squadrons have retained the designations of the former Escadres disbanded during the 1990s. For instance: Transport Escadron 1/64 Béarn (more specifically Transport Escadron 01.064 Béarn), which belonged to the 64th Transport Escadre during the dissolution of the later (recreated in August 2015). Not all escadrons (Squadrons) are necessarily attached to an Escadre.

The Escadrille (flight) has both an administrative and operational function, even of the essential operational control is done at the level of the Esacdron. A pilot is assigned to the Escadrille, however the equipment and material devices, on the other hand, are assigned to the Escadron. Since the ESTA (Aeronautic Technical Support Escadrons) came into being, material devices and the mechanics have been assigned directly to the base then put at disposition of the based Escadrons.

The Escadrilles adopted the traditions of the prestigious units out of which most (SPA and SAL), are those traditions of the First World War.

Fusiliers Commandos de l'Air 
The Fusiliers Commandos de l'Air comprise:
 Protection squadrons (EP)
 Air Parachute Commando 10 (CPA 10)
 Air Parachute Commando 20 (CPA 20)
 Air Parachute Commando 30 (CPA 30)

Protection Squadrons protect airbases inside and outside the national territory, and in exterior operations as well.

The CPAs carry out common missions, as well as specialized tasks including intervention and reinforcement of protection at the profit of sensible points " air " inside and outside the national territory.

Air bases

Flying activity in France is carried out by a network of bases, platforms and French air and space defence radar systems. It is supported by bases, which are supervised and maintained by staff, operational centres, warehouses, workshops, and schools. Both in France and abroad, bases have similar infrastructure to provide standardised support.

The French Air and Space Force has, as of 1 August 2014:
 Within the metropolitan territory of France, 27 airbases, out of the which 18 aeronautical platform with perceived runways and 5 Bases non-platform, two schools, 3 air detachments and " one attached air element " (EAR).
 Beyond the metropole/Europe, 7 Aerial Bases or permanent detachments in overseas or country.

Some French airbases house radar units (e.g. Lyon, Mont-Verdun, Drachenbronn, Cinq-Mars-la-Pile, Nice, Mont-Agel) to carry out air defence radar surveillance and air traffic control. Others house material warehouses or command posts. Temporary and semi-permanent foreign deployments include transport aircraft at Dushanbe (Tajikistan, Operation Héraclès), and fighter aircraft in N'Djamena (Tchad, Opération Épervier), among others.

As swift as the French Air and Space Force operates, the closure of aerial bases is more constant and immediate, having known a strong acceleration since the 1950s. An air base commander has authority over all units stationed on their base. Depending on the units' tasks, this means that they are responsible for approximately 600 to 2500 personnel.

On average, a base, made up of about 1500 personnel (nearly 3500 people including family), provides a yearly economic boost to its area of about 60 million euros. Consequently, determining the sites for air bases constitutes a major part of regional planning.

 BA 105 Évreux-Fauville Air Base. Command, operational and logistic support. Air transport units with 27× CASA CN-235M, 9× Transall C-160 NG.
 BA 107 Vélizy – Villacoublay Air Base. Helicopter and heavy air transport units.
 BA 113 Saint-Dizier – Robinson Air Base 4e Escadre de Chasse, 50× Rafale B and Rafale C.
 BA 116 Luxeuil - Saint-Sauveur Air Base. Air defence fighter base with 28× Mirage 2000-5F.
 BA 123 Orléans – Bricy Air Base. Air transport units with 17× Airbus A400M Atlas and 18× Lockheed C-130 Hercules. CFPSAA operational command.
 BA 133 Nancy – Ochey Air Base. Three strike fighter squadrons units with 70× Mirage 2000D, SAM sqns.
 BA 279 Châteaudun Air Base. Airplane maintenance, repair and storage airbase.
 BA 702 Avord Air Base. CFAS nuclear strike stockpile. AWACS 4× E-3F Sentry unit. Inflight refueling C-135FR unit.
 BA 705 Tours airbase. Fighter pilot training school were equipped with Alpha Jet. This school has been moved to BA 709 in 2020.
 DA 273 Romorantin air detachment. Logistics unit.
 BA 106 Bordeaux-Mérignac Airport. Transport support base for the air staff.
 BA 115 Orange-Caritat Air Base. Air defence 28× Mirage 2000C and 6× Mirage 2000B-S5.
 BA 118 Mont-de-Marsan Air Base. Home to 52× Rafale B and Rafale C. Home of CEAM, the Air and Space Force military experimentation and trials organisation, Air defence radar command reporting centre, and the air traffic control and air defence control training centre.
 BA 120 Cazaux Air Base, situated South-west of the port city of Bordeaux. Fighter pilot training squadron equipped with 45× Alpha Jet. Air and Space Force airplane stockpile.
 BA 125 Istres-Le Tubé Air Base. Two Transall C-160G strategic communication flight. Inflight refueling unit with 4× Airbus A330 MRTT and 14× KC-135FR. CEAM – the Air and Space Force military test centre.
 BA 126 Solenzara Air Base. Fighter gunnery range. SAR unit.
 DA 277 Varennes-sur-Allier. Air and Space Force supply depot. DA 277 was dissolved on 30 June 2015.
 Air Base 278 Ambérieu. Logistic support base.
 BA 701 Salon-de-Provence Air Base. Presentation Team equipped with 12× Alpha Jet. Officer instruction school. Enlisted instruction school.
 BA 709 Cognac – Châteaubernard Air Base. Basic flight training school equipped with 17× Pilatus PC-21 and UAV squadron with 8× MQ-9 Reaper.
 Air Base 721 Rochefort. Home of the NCO school, the École de formation des sous-officiers de l'armée de l'air.
 BA 942 Lyon – Mont Verdun Air Base. Air defence radar command reporting centre. National Air Operations Command (CNOA) location.
 EAR 943 Nice Mont-Agel. Air defence radar GM 406.
 DA 204 Bordeaux-Beauséjour air detachment. Logistic unit.
 EETAA 722 Saintes. Air and Space Force electronic, technical instruction also as Military basic Bootcamp.
 EPA 749 Grenoble. Air and Space Force child support school.

Overseas

 BA 160 Dakar, Senegal. Mixed units.
 Réunion, Indian Ocean.
 BA 188 Djibouti, Africa. Mixed units.
 Air elements Libreville/Gabon.
 Air elements N’Djamena/Chad. Mixed units.
 BA 190 French Polynesia (Overseas collectivity). Mixed unit.
 BA 365 Martinique (French department), West Indies. Mixed unit.
 BA 367 French Guiana (French department), South America. Mixed units.
 BA 376 Base aérienne 186 Nouméa, New Caledonia (special collectivity of France)
 BA 104 Abu Dhabi

More than ten bases have been closed since 2009. Doullens Air Base (BA 922) was a former command and reporting centre; Toulouse - Francazal Air Base (BA 101), was closed on 1 September 2009; Colmar-Meyenheim Air Base (BA 132) was closed on 16 June 2010; Metz-Frescaty Air Base (BA 128) was closed on 30 June 2011; Brétigny-sur-Orge Air Base (BA 217), closed 26 June 2012; Cambrai - Épinoy Air Base (BA 103), was closed on 28 June 2012; Reims – Champagne Air Base (June 2012); Drachenbronn Air Base (BA 901) closed on 17 July 2015; Dijon Air Base (BA 102), was vacated on 30 June 2016; Creil Air Base (BA 110) vacated on 31 August 2016; and Taverny Air Base (DA 921), the former Strategic Air Forces Command headquarters.

Inventory

Aircraft
 

The inventory of the French Air and Space Force include:

Air defense
 
The air defense inventory of the French Air and Space Force include:

Personnel 

Since the end of the Algerian War, the French Air and Space Force has comprised about 17 to 19% of the French Armed Forces. In 1990, at the end of the Cold War, numbers reached 56,400 military personnel under contract, out of which 36,300 were part of conscription and 5,400 civilians.

In 2008, forecasts for personnel of the French Air Force were expected to number 50,000 out of which 44,000 aviators on the horizon in 2014.

In 2010, the number personnel of the French Air Force was reduced to 51,100 men and women (20%) out of which: 13% officers; 55% sous-officier; 29% air military technicians (MTA); 3% volunteers of national service and aspirant volunteers; 6,500 civilians (14%). They form several functions:

 Non-flying personnel

Non-navigating personnel of the French Air and Space Force include and are not limited to : Systems Aerial Mechanics, Aerial Controllers, Meteorologists, Administrative Personnel, Air Parachute Commandos, in Informatics, in Infrastructures, in Intelligence, Commissioner of the Armies (Administrator Task).

 Flying personnel

Pilots, Mechanical Navigating Officer, Navigating Arms Systems Officer (NOSA), Combat Air Medic (CVA).

Training of personnel 

Officers, within their recruitment and future specialty, are trained at:
 École de l'air (Air School) de Provence
 École Militaire de l'Air (Military Air School)
 École des commissaires des armées (Commissioners Armies School)
 École de pilotage de l'Armée de l'air (Piloting School of the French Air and Space Force)
 École de l'aviation de transport (Aviation Transport School)
 École de l'aviation de chasse (Aviation Hunter Fighter Pilot School)
 École de transition opérationnelle (Operational Transition School)

Officers of the French Air and Space Force are spread in three corps:
 Air Officer
 Officer Mechanics
 Aerial Base Officer, amongst which, officers of the Air Parachute Commandos are featured.

Non-commissioned officers (Sous-Officiers) are trained at:
 École de formation des sous-officiers de l'Armée de l'air (EFSOAA) de Rochefort
 École interarmées (Inter-arm School) for administrative specialists
 Escadron de formation des commandos de l'air (EFCA) at Orange-Caritat Air Base (BA 115) for the personnel concerned
Military Air Technicians having been trained until 1 July 2015 at the Center of Elementary Military Formation of the Technical Instruction School of the French Air and Space Force of Saintes. Since 1 July 2015, training has taken place at Orange-Caritat Air Base, within the " Operational Combatant Preparation Center of the Air Force ".

Air traffic controllers are trained at the Center of Instruction Control and Air Defense.

Ranks

Officers

Enlisted

See also

 List of Escadres of the French Air Force
 List of French Air and Space Force aircraft squadrons
 French Naval Aviation
 List of military aircraft of France

Notes

References
 Citations

Further reading 
 Olivier, Jean-Marc, (ed.), Histoire de l'armée de l'air et des forces aériennes françaises du XVIIIe siècle à nos jours" [History of the Air Force and French aerial forces since the 18th century to the present], Toulouse, Privat, 2014, 552 p.
 
 Diego Ruiz Palmer, "France's Military Command Structures in the 1990s," in Thomas-Durell Young, Command in NATO After the Cold War: Alliance, National and Multinational Considerations, U.S. Army Strategic Studies Institute, June 1997

External links

  Official website
 
  List of air bases, appendix of the budget bill for 2006, French Senate

 
! 03
Military units and formations established in 1909
1909 establishments in France